Pepe the Bull is a 1953 Mexican sports drama film directed by Ismael Rodríguez and starring Pedro Infante, Evita Muñoz "Chachita" and Amanda del Llano. It was the last in a trilogy of films featuring Infante and Muñoz playing the father and daughter characters (Pepe El Toro and Chachita, respectively) in the 1948 releases Nosotros los Pobres (We the Poor) and Ustedes los ricos (You the Rich). A planned fourth film in the series was cancelled when Infante died in 1957. The film was nominated for three Ariel Awards.

Cast

 Pedro Infante as Pepe "El Toro" 
 Evita Muñoz "Chachita" as Chachita 
 Amanda del Llano as Amalia  
 Irma Dorantes as Lucha  
 Freddy Fernández as Atita  
 Fernando Soto as Antonio Feliciano de la Rosa  
 Juan Orraca as Don Pancho, entrenador  
 Armando Velasco as Licenciado  
 Felipe Montoya as Delegado  
 Elodia Hernández as Doña Rafaela  
 Joaquín Cordero as Lalo Gallardo  
 Wolf Ruvinskis as Bobby Galeana

References

Bibliography 
 María Luisa Amador. Cartelera cinematográfica, 1950-1959. UNAM, 1985.

External links 
 

1953 films
1950s sports drama films
Mexican sports drama films
1950s Spanish-language films
Films directed by Ismael Rodríguez
Mexican boxing films
1953 drama films
Mexican black-and-white films
1950s Mexican films